Kurasan is a village in Bhabua block of Kaimur district, Bihar, India. As of 2011, its population was 3,609, in 606 households.

References 

Villages in Kaimur district